Susana Pareja Ibarra (born 13 March 1973) is a Spanish former handball player and current coach.

She was born in Sedaví - Valencia, Spain. She competed at the 2004 Summer Olympics, where Spain finished 6th.

References

External links

1973 births
Living people
Sportspeople from Valencia
Spanish female handball players
Olympic handball players of Spain
Handball players at the 2004 Summer Olympics
Competitors at the 2005 Mediterranean Games
Mediterranean Games gold medalists for Spain
Spanish handball coaches
Mediterranean Games medalists in handball